Rebecca Alie O'Connell (née Romijn [ ; ], born November 6, 1972) is an American actress and former model. She is known for her role as Mystique in the original trilogy (2000–2006) of the X-Men film series, as Joan from The Punisher (2004) (both based on Marvel Comics), the dual roles of Laure Ash and Lily Watts in Femme Fatale (2002), and Una Chin-Riley on Star Trek: Discovery (2019) and Star Trek: Strange New Worlds (2022present). She has also had a recurring role as Alexis Meade on the television series Ugly Betty. Her other major roles include Eve Baird on the TNT series The Librarians, voicing Lois Lane in the DC Animated Movie Universe, and as the host of the reality competition show Skin Wars.

Early life
Romijn was born in Berkeley, California. Her mother, Elizabeth Romijn (née Kuizenga), is a community college instructor of English as a Second Language (ESL) and textbook author. Rebecca's father, Jaap Romijn, is a custom furniture maker. Her father is a native of Barneveld, the Netherlands, while her mother is an American of Dutch and English ancestry. Her mother met Rebecca's father as a teenager while living in the Netherlands on a student exchange program. Romijn's maternal grandfather, Henry Bernard Kuizenga, was a Presbyterian minister and seminary professor.

On The Ellen DeGeneres Show, when questioned about always being glamorous and beautiful, Romijn revealed that in her early teens she was an insecure "drama geek" and that, as a result of her growth spurt, she suffered from scoliosis and was in constant pain. Many sources say that she was once nicknamed the "Jolly Blonde Giant" because of her  height, but she has admitted to making that up "for a laugh". While studying music (voice) at the University of California, Santa Cruz, she became involved with fashion modeling and eventually moved to Paris, where she lived for more than three years.

Career
Among other jobs, Romijn started her modeling career in 1991. She has appeared on the covers of American, French, Spanish, Russian and Swedish editions of Elle, Marie Claire, American, Italian, Spanish, German, Portuguese, Russian, Greek, and Mexican editions of Cosmopolitan, Allure, Glamour, GQ, Esquire, and Sports Illustrated.

She has appeared in advertising campaigns for Escada, Christian Dior, La Perla, Tommy Hilfiger, Furla, Liz Claiborne, J. Crew, Victoria's Secret, bebe, La Senza, Dillard's, Pantene, Got Milk?, Miller Lite, and Maybelline. She has walked for Giorgio Armani, Sonia Rykiel, and Anna Molinari along with the likes of Claudia Schiffer, Stephanie Seymour, Karen Mulder, Kate Moss, Naomi Campbell, Linda Evangelista, Cindy Crawford, Helena Christensen and Christy Turlington. She was also the host of MTV's House of Style from 1998 to 2000. Romijn has been featured numerous times in annual lists of the world's most beautiful women by publications such as Maxim (2003–2007), AskMen.com (2001–2003, 2005–2006), and FHM (2000–2005). She appeared as a guest in the animated talk show Space Ghost Coast to Coast episode "Chinatown".

In 2000's X-Men, Romijn had her first major film role as Mystique; she returned to the role in 2003's sequel X2 and for X-Men: The Last Stand (2006). In these films, her costume consisted of blue makeup and some strategically placed prosthetics on her otherwise nude body. In X2 she shows up in a bar in one scene in her "normal" look and in X-Men: The Last Stand, as a dark-haired "de-powered" Mystique. The role has since been recast with Jennifer Lawrence playing the younger version of the character. She had her first leading role in Brian De Palma's Femme Fatale (2002). She also has starred in films such as Rollerball, The Punisher, and Godsend. She played the leading role in Pepper Dennis, a short-lived TV series on The WB.

In January 2007, Romijn made her first appearance on the ABC series Ugly Betty as a full-time regular cast member. She played Alexis Meade, a transgender woman and the sister of lead character Daniel Meade. In April 2008, it was reported that Romijn would only be appearing as a recurring character in Season 3 due to a change in direction by the writing staff (aligning with Romijn's pregnancy, which would have been inconsistent with her character's storyline). In November 2007, Romijn made a guest appearance on the ABC series Carpoolers, where she played the ex-wife of the character Laird, played by her real-life husband Jerry O'Connell.

Romijn starred in the ABC series Eastwick, reuniting her with her former Pepper Dennis co-star, Lindsay Price, before ABC canceled the show on November 9, 2009. She appears in an uncredited cameo in the 2011 feature film X-Men: First Class, appearing as an older version of the character played by Jennifer Lawrence. Romijn appeared as lab worker Jessie on the Adult Swim live-action show NTSF:SD:SUV:: for two seasons.
Between June and September 2013, she starred in TNT's series King & Maxwell as Michelle Maxwell, a former Secret Service agent who works as a private investigator.

In addition to her film ventures, Romijn has also recorded music, performing a cover of Prince's "Darling Nikki" for the 2005 album Electro Goth Tribute to Prince. She was also featured on the song "Color Me Love" for RuPaul's eighth studio album Realness in 2015.

She starred as Eve Baird, the guardian of the eponymous group in The Librarians, a direct spin-off of The Librarian film series. She also hosted GSN's original series and reality show Skin Wars. In 2018 she voiced Lois Lane in the DC Animated Movie Universe. In 2019, she was a recurring guest in the second season of Star Trek: Discovery, playing the character of Una Chin-Riley, first officer of the USS Enterprise. She reprised the role in the spin-off series Star Trek: Strange New Worlds, which was released in 2022. She and husband O’Connell are currently the hosts of The Real Love Boat, which premiered October 5, 2022 on CBS.

Personal life
Romijn began dating actor John Stamos in 1994 after they met at a Victoria's Secret fashion show where she was modeling. They became engaged on Christmas Eve 1997, and married on September 19, 1998 at the Beverly Hills Hotel. During the marriage, she used the name Rebecca Romijn-Stamos personally and professionally. They announced their separation in April 2004. Stamos filed for divorce in August 2004, and it became final on March 1, 2005.

Romijn resumed using her maiden name, but revealed in an August 2013 interview on Conan that she had never legally changed her name back from Romijn-Stamos after a Conan staff member noticed "Romijn-Stamos" on her driver's license.

In 2004, Romijn started dating actor Jerry O'Connell. They became engaged in September 2005, and married at their home in Calabasas, California on July 14, 2007. They have twin daughters, born in 2008.

Filmography

Film

Television

Other work

Awards and nominations

References

External links

1972 births
American female models
American film actresses
American people of Dutch descent
American people of English descent
American television actresses
American voice actresses
Berkeley High School (Berkeley, California) alumni
Living people
Actresses from Berkeley, California
University of California, Santa Cruz alumni
20th-century American actresses
21st-century American actresses